Ambala is a Sambalic language spoken in the Philippines. It has more than 2,000 speakers and is spoken within Aeta communities in the Zambal municipalities of Subic, San Marcelino, and Castillejos; in the city of Olongapo; and in Dinalupihan, Bataan.

Reid (1994) reports the following Ambala locations, from SIL word lists:
Maliwacat, Cabalan, Olongapo, Zambales
Batong Kalyo (Pili), San Marcelino, Zambales

Himes (2012) also collected Ambala data from the following locations:
Pastolan, Subic Bay Metropolitan Authority
Gordon Heights, Olongapo City

See also
Languages of the Philippines

References

Endangered Austronesian languages
Sambalic languages
Aeta languages
Languages of Zambales
Languages of Bataan